Flustrellidra is a genus of bryozoans belonging to the family Flustrellidridae.

The species of this genus are found in Northern Hemisphere.

Species:

Flustrellidra akkeshiensis 
Flustrellidra armata 
Flustrellidra aspinosa 
Flustrellidra cervicornis 
Flustrellidra corniculata 
Flustrellidra filispina 
Flustrellidra gigantea 
Flustrellidra hispida 
Flustrellidra kurilensis 
Flustrellidra prouhoi 
Flustrellidra spinifera 
Flustrellidra stolonifera 
Flustrellidra vegae

References

Bryozoan genera
Ctenostomatida